Reuel D'Souza (born March 10, 1999) is a male water polo player from Canada. He is a member of the Canada men's national water polo team.

D'Souza is from Mangalore, India.

References 

Living people
1999 births
Canadian male water polo players
Sportspeople from Mangalore
Pan American Games medalists in water polo
Pan American Games silver medalists for Canada
Medalists at the 2019 Pan American Games
Water polo players at the 2019 Pan American Games